The Brewers of Europe was founded in 1958 in Brussels as a not-for-profit European association. Its aim is to be the voice of the European brewing sector to the European institutions and international organisations.  Current members are the national brewers’ associations from EU Member States, plus Norway, Switzerland and Turkey.

European Brewery Convention
Founded in 1947, the European Brewery Convention (EBC) is the scientific and technological arm of The Brewers of Europe, defining itself in terms of "facilitating knowledge creation, transfer and collaboration among partners, beer producers and academic organisations, for the benefit of the brewing sector, consumers and the community." EBC is perhaps best known for the biennial EBC Congress, a forum for scientific exchange among European and global brewers.

Organisation
The Brewers of Europe overall encourages an open dialogue between its members in relation to all issues falling under the remit of the association.

By promoting its interests and advising the EU institutions and international organisations on all aspects of policy and legislation affecting the brewing sector, The Brewers of Europe is thus able to inform the European and international institutions of its special needs and to ensure that legislative initiatives take the sector’s requirements into consideration.

The organisation represents the interests of the roughly 8500 brewers across Europe, the vast majority are small and medium-sized, local and family-run establishments.  In addition, the organisation seeks to represent and defend the interests of those 2 million people across Europe whose jobs are due to beer.

Main issues
Overall, The Brewers of Europe works across 5 main themes:

Beer & Society
Beer & Economy
Beer Integrity
EBC – European Brewing Convention
Communications

References

External links
Official site
EBC official site

Beer organizations
Pan-European food industry trade groups